Time and Again (sometimes written as Time & Again) is a 1951 science fiction novel by American writer Clifford D. Simak. An alternate paperback title was First He Died; it was also serialized (with a different ending) as Time Quarry.

The plot involved a long-lost spaceman returning to Earth from a distant planet where the "souls" of humans may live. His fuddled observations spark a religious schism and war, and "future folk insist [he] should be killed on sight as he will otherwise write a book that, because it tells a truth inconvenient to religious bigots, will cause the death of millions". Evolutionary transcendence is a theme, as it was for a number of other Simak novels. The novel is one of Simak's more popular works.

References

External links 
 

1951 American novels
1951 science fiction novels
American science fiction novels
Novels by Clifford D. Simak
Novels about religion
Simon & Schuster books